The Port of Jakhau is a fair weather port on the Gulf of Kutch, Kutch District, in the state of Gujarat, India. The port is partially sheltered from the direct sea-waves, but remains closed during the monsoon season. The port is operated by the Gujarat Maritime Board and renovated in 2001 in modern way.

The nearest railway stations are in naliya Bhuj and Gandhidham, and the nearest airport is in Bhuj Airport. The port boasts of entire Gujarat's fishing community and almost all types of  boats.

References

Jakhau
Transport in Kutch district